WZLT (99.3 FM, "New Country 99.3") is a radio station broadcasting a country music format. Licensed to Lexington, Tennessee, United States, the station is currently owned by Lexington Broadcasting Services, Inc. and features programming from CBS Radio Network.

References

External links

ZLT
Country radio stations in the United States
Henderson County, Tennessee